Apistosia judas is a moth of the subfamily Arctiinae. It was described by Jacob Hübner in 1827. It is found in Guatemala, Honduras, Brazil, Nicaragua and Panama.

References

Moths described in 1827
Lithosiini
Moths of Central America
Moths of South America